On March 23, 1824, Hutchins G. Burton (DR), who had represented , resigned upon being elected Governor.  A special election was held to fill the resulting vacancy on January 6, 1825

Election results

There were, in addition, 3 scattering votes.

See also
 List of special elections to the United States House of Representatives
 1824 and 1825 United States House of Representatives elections

References

1825 02
North Carolina 1825 02
North Carolina 02
United States House of Representatives 02
United States House of Representatives 1825 02
Special elections to the 15th United States Congress